Leary may refer to:


People
 King Leary or Lóegaire mac Néill, an Irish king
Leary (surname)

Places
Leary, Georgia, U.S.
Leary, Texas, U.S.

Other uses
Leary v. United States, a 1969 U.S. Supreme Court case
Lt. Leary series, a science fiction novel series by David Drake
USS Leary, three ships of the United States Navy

See also
O'Leary
Lóegaire, an Irish anglicized to Leary